The 1989 Stanley Cup Finals was the championship series of the National Hockey League's (NHL) 1988–89 season, and the culmination of the 1989 Stanley Cup playoffs. It was contested between the Calgary Flames and the Montreal Canadiens, the top two teams during the regular season. This was the second time in the decade after 1986 that the Canadiens and Flames met in the Finals. The 1989 series remains to date the last time that two Canadian teams faced each other for the Stanley Cup.

The Flames defeated the Canadiens in six games to win their first and only Stanley Cup. The winning goal in game six was scored by Doug Gilmour. They became the first team to win a Stanley Cup after relocating, as they had begun life as the Atlanta Flames in 1972. Since then, four more teams have accomplished this feat: the New Jersey Devils (formerly the Kansas City Scouts and Colorado Rockies), the Colorado Avalanche (formerly the Quebec Nordiques), the Dallas Stars (formerly the Minnesota North Stars), and the Carolina Hurricanes (formerly the New England/Hartford Whalers). This was also the second-to-last of eight consecutive Finals where either the Flames or their provincial rival Edmonton Oilers represented Alberta in the Stanley Cup Finals and the second-to-last of nine consecutive Finals in which either the Flames or their Western Canada rivals represented that area in the Stanley Cup Finals, as  featured the Vancouver Canucks, the Flames' rivals in Western Canada. Both Calgary and Montreal were the only two teams to win the Stanley Cup in the 1980s other than the New York Islanders and the Edmonton Oilers. This was the first time since 1975 that the Cup was won by a team other than the Canadiens, the Islanders, or the Oilers.

This was the Canadiens' first defeat in a Cup Finals since . The defeat was Patrick Roy's only Cup Finals where he was not on the winning side; he went on to win the 1993 Cup with the Canadiens and the 1996 and 2001 Cups with the Avalanche.

The 1989 Finals featured two coaches making their first appearances, as Calgary's Terry Crisp faced Montreal's Pat Burns. For Crisp it was his only appearance, while Burns returned one more time in 2003 where he led the Devils to their third Cup. In the interim between their two matches both teams had replaced their coaches; Crisp was hired to replace Badger Bob Johnson after his departure following the 1987 season while Burns took over for 1986 Cup winning coach Jean Perron after his 1988 firing. For Crisp, this was his third Stanley Cup championship in his career. He had already won two as a player with the Philadelphia Flyers in 1974 and 1975. Following the series, Bob Gainey, Rick Green, and Lanny McDonald retired, while long time defenceman Larry Robinson signed with the Los Angeles Kings, where he played the final three years of his career.

Paths to the Finals

Calgary defeated the Vancouver Canucks 4–3, the Los Angeles Kings 4–0 and the Chicago Blackhawks 4–1 to advance to the Final.

Montreal defeated the Hartford Whalers 4–0, the Boston Bruins 4–1 and the Philadelphia Flyers 4–2.

Game summaries

Co-captain Lanny McDonald scored the second Flames goal in game six. This turned out to be the last goal in his Hockey Hall of Fame career because he retired during the following off-season. It was also his only Stanley Cup victory. Doug Gilmour scored two goals in the third period, including the eventual game and Cup winner to cement the victory for the Flames. Al MacInnis won the Conn Smythe Trophy as playoff MVP, and at 31 points, became the first defenceman to lead the NHL in post-season scoring. The Calgary Flames are the only visiting team to ever win the Stanley Cup by defeating the Montreal Canadiens at the Montreal Forum. The only other visiting team to win the Stanley Cup at the Montreal Forum was the New York Rangers, when they defeated the Montreal Maroons in 1928.

Broadcasting
This was the first Cup Finals since 1984 that the CBC had the sole English-language rights to the entire series in Canada instead of having to share it with another network. This was also the first season that SportsChannel America held the national U.S rights.

Team rosters
Years indicated in boldface under the "Finals appearance" column signify that the player won the Stanley Cup in the given year.

Calgary Flames

Montreal Canadiens

Stanley Cup engraving
The 1989 Stanley Cup was presented to Flames co-captains Lanny McDonald, Tim Hunter, and Jim Peplinski by NHL President John Ziegler following the Flames 4–2 win over the Canadiens in game six.

The following Flames players and staff had their names engraved on the Stanley Cup

1988–89 Calgary Flames

Stanley Cup Finals Patch
The 1989 Stanley Cup Finals was the first to feature a special commemorative patch on both teams' sweaters, in honor of the championship series. Placed on each player's left shoulder, the patch employed the same design that was used from 1989–1994 before being tweaked for the 1995 Finals. A commemorative patch has been issued in every Stanley Cup Finals since, though subsequent patches were sewn onto the sweaters'` upper right breast area (with the only exceptions being the 1994 and 2014 New York Rangers, whose diagonal wordmark necessitated the patch's placement on the top of each sweater's left shoulder).

Notes

References 

 
Stan
Stanley Cup Finals
Calgary Flames games
Montreal Canadiens games
Stanley Cup Finals
1980s in Calgary
Stanley Cup Finals
Ice hockey competitions in Montreal
Ice hockey competitions in Calgary
1980s in Montreal
1989 in Quebec